Esthera Petre (born 13 May 1990, Bucharest) is a Romanian high jumper.  She competed at the 2012 Summer Olympics.

Achievements

References

External links
 

1990 births
Living people
Romanian female high jumpers
Athletes (track and field) at the 2012 Summer Olympics
Olympic athletes of Romania
Sportspeople from Bucharest